This is an overview of the progression of the world track cycling record of the men's team sprint as recognised by the Union Cycliste Internationale.

Progression

References

Track cycling world record progressions